Sebastião Leme da Silveira Cintra (January 20, 1882 – October 17, 1942) was a Brazilian Cardinal of the Roman Catholic Church. He served as Archbishop of São Sebastião do Rio de Janeiro from 1930 until his death, and was elevated to the cardinalate in 1930.

Biography

Early life and ministry
Born in Espírito Santo do Pinhal, Sebastião da Silveira Cintra studied at the seminary in São Paulo and the Pontifical Gregorian University in Rome before being ordained to the priesthood on October 28, 1904. He then did pastoral work in the Archdiocese of São Paulo, including serving as a seminary professor and the director of the archdiocesan newspaper A Gazeta do Povo. He was a cathedral canon from 1904 to 1910, and Pro-Vicar General of São Paulo from 1909 to 1911.

Bishop
On March 24, 1911, Cintra was appointed Auxiliary Bishop of São Sebastião do Rio de Janeiro and Titular Bishop of Orthosias in Phoenicia by Pope Pius X. He received his episcopal consecration on the following June 24 from Joaquim Arcoverde de Albuquerque Cavalcanti, with Archbishop Francisco do Rego Maia and Bishop Juan Terrero y Escalada serving as co-consecrators, in Rome. Cintra was later named Archbishop of Olinda on April 29, 1916; he also assumed leadership of the archdiocese of Recife when it was united with Olinda two years later in 1918. On March 15, 1921, he became Coadjutor Archbishop of São Sebastião do Rio de Janeiro and Titular Archbishop of Pharsalus. The appointment of a Coadjutor Archbishop of Rio de Janeiro had been rendered necessary by the failing health of the local Ordinary, Cardinal Arcoverde, Brazil's first Cardinal. As Coadjutor, Cintra, who had been consecrated to the Episcopate by Arcoverde and who had served as his auxiliary Bishop, now aided Arcoverde in the government of the See of Rio de Janeiro. Cintra also consecrated Carlos Duarte Costa (later excommunicated and Patriarch of ICAB) as Bishop of Botucatu on December 8, 1924.

Cardinal
Cintra eventually succeeded Cardinal Arcoverde as Archbishop of São Sebastião do Rio de Janeiro upon the latter's death on April 18, 1930. Pope Pius XI created him Cardinal Priest of Santi Alessio e Bonifacio in the consistory of July 3 of that same year.

Also in 1930, in November, he intervened in the revolution through which Getúlio Vargas assumed power: The Cardinal was credited with saving the life of the incumbent president, Washington Luís. The revolutionary forces surrounded Guanabara Palace and were set to invade it, but the Cardinal succeeded in gaining admission to the Palace to negotiate the withdrawal of the deposed President, thus avoiding bloodshed. Before entering the President's office in Guanabara Palace, he said to the cabinet: "Time does not permit vacillation. The exaltation and animation of the people is great and I urge the President to retire to a fort or barracks. I have been insisting on this for nine hours and now it is almost too late". Cintra then successfully persuaded Luís to resign after a half-hour-long conversation.

Among the many events to which he served as papal legate was the dedication of Christ the Redeemer on September 14, 1931. Cintra was one of the cardinal electors who participated in the conclave of 1939, which elected Pope Pius XII. In 1941, he founded the Catholic University of Rio de Janeiro, that later was granted the title of "Pontifical Catholic University".

Death
On October 17, 1942, Cardinal Cintra died from a heart attack at age 60 in Rio de Janeiro and is buried at the Shrine of the Eucharistic Heart of Jesus, located in the city.

References

External links
Cardinals of the Holy Roman Church

1882 births
1942 deaths
Brazilian cardinals
20th-century Roman Catholic archbishops in Brazil
Pontifical Catholic University of Rio de Janeiro people
Roman Catholic archbishops of Olinda e Recife
Roman Catholic bishops of São Sebastião do Rio de Janeiro
Roman Catholic archbishops of São Sebastião do Rio de Janeiro